Andrei Aleksandrovich Razin (born 15 September 1963) is Russian musician, producer of the group Laskovyi Mai.

Biography 
Razin was born on 15 September 1963 in Stavropol.

From 1964 to 1972 he was brought up in the Kislovodsk sanatorium orphanage. From 1972 to 1978 he was a pupil of the Svetlogradsky orphanage, where he finished 8 classes.

From 1977 to 1979 he studied at the Stavropol GPTU 24, received the profession of mason. From 1979 to 1982 he worked on the direction of the Komsomol in the regions of the Far North.

He graduated from the East Siberian Academy of Culture and Arts and Stavropol State University. Candidate of Economic Sciences.

In 1985 he first appeared on television as a singer. From 1988 to 1991 – General Director of the All-Union Central Creative Studio of the Ministry of Culture of the USSR for gifted orphans.

In 1993, Andrei Razin became the rector of the Stavropol Institute of Contemporary Arts at the Stavropol State University. In the presidential election in 1996, he was the trustee of Gennady Zyuganov.

Also in December he ran for the State Duma of the third convocation in Stavropol single-mandate electoral district No. 55 as an independent deputy. In the elections he took 2nd place out of 16 (14.38% of votes), losing to Vasily Iver (18.08%).

On 1 July 2008, by the decision of the president of the Russian Olympic Committee, he was appointed general director of the International Olympic Festival and the post of artistic director of the Russian Olympic Committee.

Since 2015 he is an adviser to the mayor of Yalta.

Mirage
He worked as the administrator of the Mirage group. For the first time he performed a duet with singer Katya Semyonova.

Laskovyi Mai
From 1987 to 1990 he worked as a producer-manager in the All-Union Association of the Ministry of Culture of the USSR SPM Record. In June 1988, the album of the group  Laskovyi Mai, recorded in the city of Orenburg, got into Razin's hands. On 4 July that year, he transported the group to Moscow. On 9 September 1988, thanks to Sergei Kuznetsov in the capital, Yuri Shatunov became the lead singer of the group. Then followed work in the recording studio and numerous tours by the band. His idol was the singer Donna Summer, so he himself became a soloist of  Laskovyi Mai. He performed songs of his band and hits of other famous authors, for example, the song On the White Blanket of January by Oleg Khromov.

References

External links
 Official Website
  Andrei Razin on Facebook
Andrei Razin on Instagram
Andrei Razin on YouTube

1963 births
Living people
People from Stavropol
Russian record producers
Soviet male singers
Soviet pop singers
United Russia politicians
21st-century Russian politicians
20th-century Russian male singers
20th-century Russian singers